Business journalism is the part of journalism that tracks, records, analyzes and interprets the business, economic and financial activities and changes that take place in societies. Topics widely cover the entire purview of all commercial activities related to the economy.

This area of journalism provides news and feature articles about people, places and issues related to the business sector. Most newspapers, magazines, radio, and television-news shows include a business segment. Detailed and in-depth business journalism may appear in publications, radio, and television channels dedicated specifically to business and financial journalism.

History 
Business journalism began as early as the Middle Ages, to help well-known trading families communicate with each other.

Around 1700, Daniel Defoe—best known for his novels especially Robinson Crusoe—began publishing business and economic news. In 1882 Charles Dow, Edward Jones and Charles Bergstresser began a wire service that delivered news to investment houses along Wall Street. And in 1889, The Wall Street Journal began publishing. While the famous muckraking journalist Ida Tarbell did not consider herself to be a business reporter, her reporting and writing about the Standard Oil Co. in 1902 provided the template for how thousands of business journalists have covered companies ever since. Business coverage gained prominence in the 1990s, with wider investment in the stock market. The Wall Street Journal is one prominent example of business journalism, and is among the United States of America's top newspapers in terms of both circulation and respect for the journalists whose work appears there.

Personnel 
Journalists who work in this branch are classed as "business journalists". Their main task is to gather information about current events as they related to business. They may also cover processes, trends, consequences, and important people, in business and disseminate their work through all types of mass media.

Scope 
Business journalism, although common in most industrialized countries, has a very limited role in third-world and developing countries. This leaves citizens of such countries in a very disadvantaged position locally and internationally. Recent efforts to bring business media to these countries have proven to be worthwhile.

See also 
Gerald Loeb Award
Business Insider
Forbes
Financial Times
Nihon Keizai Shinbun
Weekend City Press Review

References

Further reading 
 
 Profits and Losses: Business Journalism and its Role in Society, Roush, Chris, 2010. Marion Street Press: Portland, OR. 
 Show me the Money: Writing Business and Economics Stories for Mass Communication, Roush, Chris, 2016, Routledge: New York.

External links
 Definition and history of business journalism in the Encyclopedia of Journalism

 
News
Journalism by field